Naples is a city in Uintah County, Utah, United States. The population was 2,282 at the 2020 United States Census. Naples was listed as a town in 2000; it has since been classified as a fifth-class city by state law.

Geography
According to the United States Census Bureau, the city has a total area of 6.5 square miles (16.9 km²), all land.

Demographics

As of the 2000 United States Census, there were 1,300 people, 402 households, and 344 families in the town. The population density was 199.0 people per square mile (76.9/km²). There were 416 housing units at an average density of 63.7 per square mile (24.6/km²). The racial makeup is 98.46% White, 0.31% Native American, 0.23% from other races, and 1.00% from two or more races. Hispanic or Latino of any race were 2.85% of the population.

There were 402 households, out of which 50.7% had children under the age of 18 living with them, 74.6% were married couples living together, 8.7% had a female householder with no husband present, and 14.4% were non-families. 11.7% of all households were made up of individuals, and 4.7% had someone living alone who was 65 years of age or older. The average household size was 3.23 and the average family size was 3.53.

The town population contained 38.0% under the age of 18, 7.4% from 18 to 24, 27.8% from 25 to 44, 18.4% from 45 to 64, and 8.5% who were 65 years of age or older. The median age was 29 years. For every 100 females, there were 100.0 males. For every 100 females age 18 and over, there were 95.2 males.

The median income for a household in the town was $43,158, and the median income for a family was $47,500. Males had a median income of $38,625 versus $25,000 for females. The per capita income was $14,517. About 4.7% of families and 6.7% of the population were below the poverty line, including 7.8% of those under age 18 and 5.8% of those age 65 or over.

Attractions
Games, Anime, and More is a biannual fan convention. It is a multi-genre convention having video games, card games, cartoons, costumes, tournaments, tabletop gaming, and similar activities. The GAM Convention is held during March and August in Uintah County, Utah. In 2015 it was the first anime convention held in Vernal, Utah as well as the first gaming convention held there, making it the first convention of its type in Vernal. In 2016 it was held in Naples, making GAM the first convention of its type in the city of Naples.

Notable people
 Earl W. Bascom (1906–1995), Hollywood actor, artist, inventor, rodeo cowboy, Canadian Pro Rodeo Hall of Fame, Alberta Sports Hall of Fame, Utah Sports Hall of Fame, Utah Rodeo Hall of Fame, "Father of Modern Rodeo"

References

External links

 Naples City, Utah

Cities in Utah
Cities in Uintah County, Utah
Populated places established in 1878